His Honour Gordon Alchin (January 1894 – 14 May 1947) was a British poet, airman, judge and Liberal Party politician.

Background
Alchin was born the son of Alfred Head Alchin of Rusthall, Kent. He was educated at Tonbridge School and Brasenose College, Oxford. He was a Junior Hulme Scholar, BNC 1913. His education was interrupted by war. After demobilisation in 1919 he returned to his studies at Oxford. In 1920 he was a Senior Hulme Scholar, BCL, MA, Eldon Scholar. In 1924 he married Sylvia Wrensted. They had one son and one daughter. She died in 1939.

Professional career
Alchin served during World War I, from 1914–15, as a Second lieutenant in the Royal Field Artillery at Flanders. In 1915 he joined the Royal Flying Corps and served until 1917 with the Australian Flying Corps. In 1922 he was called to the bar by Middle Temple. As a barrister he practised at Common Law and Commercial Bar until 1940. In 1940 he joined the Royal Air Force Voluntary Reserve. From 1940-45 he served as a County Court judge on Circuit No. 38 Edmonton. In 1945 he served as a County Court judge on Circuit No. 40 Bow until his death.

Political career
Alchin was Liberal candidate for the Tonbridge division of Kent at the 1929 General Election. Tonbridge was a safe Unionist seat where the Liberals had been pushed into third place at the previous general election. He was able to increase the Liberal vote share and win back second place. He did not stand for parliament again.

Electoral record

Writing
Alchin wrote verse and short stories. He was one of the poets who contributed to The Muse in Arms, an anthology of British war poetry published in November 1917 during World War I.

References

1894 births
1947 deaths
Liberal Party (UK) parliamentary candidates
People educated at Tonbridge School
Alumni of Brasenose College, Oxford
Members of the Middle Temple
British Army personnel of World War I
English World War I poets
British World War I pilots
Royal Field Artillery officers
Royal Flying Corps officers
Australian Flying Corps officers
Royal Air Force Volunteer Reserve personnel of World War II
County Court judges (England and Wales)